Sean O'Brien Strub (born May 16, 1958) is an American writer, activist, politician and entrepreneur. He is a pioneer expert in mass-marketed fundraising for LGBT equality.

Strub is a resident and the current mayor of Milford, Pennsylvania. He was formerly the owner of the Hotel Fauchere, a historic European-style boutique hotel in Milford that was a member of Relais & Chateaux. He is also the director of The Sero Project, a national network of people with HIV combating stigma and injustice.

He is a long-term AIDS survivor  and has been an outspoken advocate for the self-empowerment movement for people with HIV/AIDS. In 2009 he was president of Cable Positive, the cable and telecommunications' industry's AIDS response.  From 2010 to 2012, he served on the board of directors of the Amsterdam-based Global Network of People Living with HIV/AIDS (GNP+) and co-chaired their North American regional affiliate. He has been a leader in combating HIV-related criminalization and in 2010 launched the Positive Justice Project with the Center for HIV Law & Policy.

In 1990, he ran for the House of Representatives to represent New York's 22nd congressional district (which in those days included Rockland County and parts of Orange, Westchester and Sullivan Counties). He was the first openly HIV+ candidate for federal office in the U.S. and received 46% of the Democratic primary vote. He was a long-time member of ACT UP New York and, in 1992,  produced an off-Broadway play, The Night Larry Kramer Kissed Me, written by and starring David Drake.

His memoir, Body Counts: A Memoir of Politics, Sex, AIDS and Survival (Scribner) was published in January 2014. Strub co-authored Rating America's Corporate Conscience (Addison-Wesley, 1985), a guide to corporate social responsibility, with Steve Lydenberg and Alice Tepper Marlin and Cracking the Corporate Closet (HarperBusiness, 1995) with Daniel B. Baker and Bill Henning.

In 2014, Strub criticized National Institute of Allergy and Infectious Diseases (NIAID) director Anthony Fauci for "delaying promotion of an AIDS treatment that would have prevented tens of thousands of deaths in the first years of the epidemic." and accused him of "rewriting history."

He is an inaugural member of the WikiQueer Global Advisory Board.

Miscellaneous
In 1981, Strub got playwright Tennessee Williams to sign the first fundraising letter for the Human Rights Campaign Fund, a then-newly formed political action committee which grew to become the largest organization in the U.S. advocating for LGBT equality.

In 1989, Strub asked pop artist Keith Haring to create a logo and poster to launch National Coming Out Day, now also a part of the Human Rights Campaign.

Strub was one of the AIDS activists who put a giant condom over then-US Senator Jesse Helms's suburban Washington home in 1991.

References

External links

1958 births
Living people
HIV/AIDS activists
American gay writers
People with HIV/AIDS
American LGBT businesspeople
LGBT people from Iowa
Gay memoirists
American LGBT dramatists and playwrights
Male dramatists and playwrights